To the Dearest Intruder is a 2015 Taiwanese television series created and produced by Eastern Television. It stars Amber An, Melvin Sia,  and Marcus Chang. Filming began on April 18, 2015, and wrapped up on August 14, 2015. First original broadcast began on August 22, 2015, on TTV airing every Saturday night at 10:00-11:30 pm.

Synopsis 
Sometimes best friends like all the same things. But what happens when one of those things is the same man? Song Jia An and Luo Shao Qing are best friends in college. They both are in love with Yan Hao, but Shao Qing learns that Jia An has been saying from childhood that she plans to marry Yan Hao. However, Yan Hao develops feelings for Shao Qing and may have chosen her over Jia An. But his life is suddenly thrust in a different direction when his father is shot to death over money issues, leaving Yan Hao to pay off his father's debt while also trying to establish his own company. Jia An stays by his side during this trying time, so Shao Qing feels she needs to be out of the picture. Ten years later, Yan Hao and Jia An are married and meet up with Shao Qing again at a school reunion. When Yan Hao sees Shao Qing again, he realizes that he is with the wrong woman. Can he make things right after 10 years or will the cruel hands of fate get in the way again?

Cast

Main cast
Amber An as Song Jia An (Ria) - The naive and real wife of Yan Hao (Ivan).
Melvin Sia as Yan Hao (Ivan)
 as Lo Shao Qing (Sharlene) - The main antagonist of the series. she is the mistress  of Yan Hao, Lo Shao is mentally unstable and psychopath.
Marcus Chang (Marco) as Zhang Zhen Lun

Supporting cast
Frankie Huang as Sun Zhong Xian 
An Jun Peng as Yan Ran 
 (Guo Wen Yi) as Du Mei Mei 
 (Bai Jing Yi) as Dou Ying Jun 
Shen Pei Yi as Maggie
Xie Shan Shan as Zhuan Zhuan

Cameo
 as homeless elderly man
 as interviewer
 as Li Zhi Wei 
Francesca Kao as  Lo's mother
Su Yi Jing as Mrs. Ye
 as Brother Chen

Soundtrack
If We Meet Again 如果我們再相遇 by Wang Li Ren
 王笠人
Don't Say You Never Loved 別說沒愛過 by William Wei 韋禮安
We Are Still In Love 我們依然愛著 by Fran
Us 我們 by Jing Wen Tseng 曾静玟 feat. Fang Wu 吳汶芳
Every Third Person 每個第三者 by Hope Yang 楊蒨時
Ten Years 十年(國) by Eason Chan 陳奕迅
Good to Have You 有你真好 by Christine Fan 范瑋琪 feat. Rainie Yang 楊丞琳

Episode ratings
<small>Competing dramas on rival channels airing at the same time slot were:
SET Metro - When I See You Again, Bromance
TVBS Entertainment Channel - Youth Power, Wake Up, Taste of Love
EBC Variety - Love Cuisine, Marry Me, or Not?
Much TV -

External links
To the Dearest Intruder TTV Website 
To the Dearest Intruder ETTV Website  
 

2015 Taiwanese television series debuts
2015 Taiwanese television series endings
Eastern Television original programming
Taiwan Television original programming
Taiwanese romance television series
Taiwanese drama television series